Diouna is a village and rural commune in the Cercle of Ségou in the Ségou Region of southern-central Mali. The commune includes 11 villages in an area of approximately 175 square kilometers. In the 2009 census it had a population of 9,244. The chef-lieu of the commune is the village of Diouna which lies 49 km east of Ségou.

References

External links
.
.

Communes of Ségou Region